The TelstraClear Challenge - rebranded in 2013 to "Bike the Bridge" - is an annual cycling event held in Auckland that allows entrants to cycle over the Auckland Harbour Bridge, one of the only two times each year that cyclists are legally allowed to do so, the other event being the Auckland Ironman 70.3 triathlon held in January. It is both a race and a leisure ride, aimed at cyclists of all skill levels.

History 
The event was first run on 11 December 2011, and attracted approximately 4000 cyclists, despite the high wind that often buffets the Harbour Bridge. Auckland Mayor Len Brown competed in the race, highlighting the need for Auckland to transition to a cycling culture.

Cycling over the Harbour Bridge (which usually does not allow pedestrians or cyclists) was proposed soon after its completion in 1959, and many riders attempted it illegally. Due to the vehicle-centric design of the bridge, that was deemed impractical until the TelstraClear Challenge was successfully pitched to the NZ Transport Agency. Rider safety was achieved by a row of 160 buses supplied by NZ Bus which protected the riders from oncoming traffic.

Owing to a lack of sponsorship, the 2012 event, scheduled for 11 November, was cancelled.

The event returned for its second running on 10 November 2013 as "Bike the Bridge". Notable changes from the inaugural event included new courses of 104 km, 50 km and 20 km that included the bridge-crossing, a new finishing venue at North Harbour Stadium in the Auckland suburb of Albany, and a charity partnership to raise funds for Multiple Sclerosis. Media coverage was limited to public announcements of the bridge closure.

Future Events 

The organisers hope for it to become seen as the cycling equivalent of the Auckland Marathon, a running event that also goes over the Harbour Bridge.

References

External links 
Inaugural day greeted by high winds
Launch of the first ever cycle event over the Auckland Harbour Bridge
TV3 coverage of the inaugural event
 TVNZ coverage of the inaugural event
Official Website
Official Website 2013

Cycling in New Zealand
Sport in Auckland